Gurua is a community development block that forms an administrative division in Gaya district, Bihar state, India.

Gurua is a Block positioned in Gaya district in Bihar. Situated in rural/urban area of Bihar.

It is one of the 24 blocks of Gaya district. As per the government register, the block 

number of Gurua is 486. The block has 175 villages and there are total 29938 

families in this Block. 

Population of Gurua Block

As per Census 2011, Gurua's population is 184286. Out of this, 94987 are males 

while the females count 89299 here. This block has 34095 children in the age group 

of 0-6 years. Among them 17388 are boys and 16707 are girls.

literacy rate of Gurua Block

Literacy rate in Gurua block is 52%. 95975 out of total 184286 population is literate 

here. In males the literacy rate is 60% as 57079 males out of total 94987 are 

educated however female literacy ratio is 43% as 38896 out of total 89299 females 

are educated in this Block.

The dark portion is that illiteracy ratio of Gurua block is 47%. Here 88311 out of total 

184286 people are illiterate. Male illiteracy rate here is 39% as 37908 males out of 

total 94987 are uneducated. Among the females the illiteracy rate is 56% and 50403 

out of total 89299 females are illiterate in this block.

Geography 

Baijudham Temple

Literacy 
As per 2011 census, literacy in Dhanbad district was 72.52. Literacy in Bihar (for population over 7 years) was 60.41% in 2011. Literacy in India in 2011 was 74.04%.

References 

Community development blocks in Gaya district